Respond Housing Association and Service Provide is a housing association and service provider, with a staff of over 350. Respond have 1,453 homes in construction around the country (2023).  A founder of Respond in 1981, Fr. Patrick Coogan OFM, served as CEO for over thirty years retiring in 2015. The current CEO is Declan Dunne.

Direct Construction 
Respond deliver social and cost rental homes. In 2022, they delivered the first purpose build cost rental homes in Ireland, alongside their partners. Respond are one of the few Approved Housing Bodies in the country to directly manage construction. Respond have their own in house Development team, led by Parag Joglekar. The team is a multi-disciplinary team of registered architects, quantity surveyors, planners, clerks of works, technicians and project managers who deal with all aspects of construction and project delivery.

Managing Housing 
Respond is responsible for various housing developments with 7,084 homes in the 26 counties of Ireland. These are managed by a Housing department led by Neil Bolton and made up of a tenant relations team who work with tenants to build and support communities where people want to live and as asset management team that maintain, repair and upgrade Respond homes. Respond report that 90% of their tenants are satisfied with their overall service.

Building Communities 
Respond recognised from an early stage that people need homes but they also need communities and services around these home. Over half of the staff comes from a social care background. The organisation provides community services including 17 Early Years and School Age Care services, six Family Homeless services, three Day Care for Older People services, Family Support services and has delivered 8 Refugee Resettlement services for local authorities. The Services team is led by Louisa Carr.

Working at Respond
Respond is a listening and learning organisation and is progressing several programmes of continuous improvement including becoming a trauma informed organisation. Respond partners with the Global Brain Health Institute (GBHI) based in Trinity College Dublin. The partnership aims to examine our understanding of brain health and how it can be applied to housing design and to the provision and the development of sustainable communities. The organisation reports a very high level of staff engagement, with a Net Promoter Score of 45.

Improving Quality (IQ) Accreditation Standard 
In 2022, Respond achieved the Improving Quality (IQ) Accreditation Standard. IQ is recognised as a key quality framework for the voluntary sector in the Republic of Ireland and the UK and provides independent assurance of the essential areas necessary for the effective management and governance of a charity or other third sector organisation. Run by Community Matters in the UK, IQ addresses all the key areas of organisational life in four elements; accountability, effectiveness, sustainability and welcome (including the involvement of service users, development of staff, equality and diversity).

Executive Management Team 
Respond's Executive Management Team is made up of Declan Dunne (CEO), Nessa Aylmer (Head of Compliance), Neil Bolton (Head of Housing), Louisa Carr (Head of Services), Ray Fanning (Head of Finance), Parag Joglekar (Head of Development), Olivia McCann (Director of Legal Services and Compliance) and Niamh Randall (Head of Advocacy and Communications).

Board of Directors 
Noel Kelly is the Chair of Respond's Board. Other Board members include Michael Anglim, Cathleen Callanan, Brendan Cummins, Daniel Vincent McCarthy, Jennifer Maher, John O'Connor and Joseph O'Connor. Olivia McCann is Company Secretary.

Housing associations based in the Republic of Ireland